Jordi Oliva Izquierdo (30 May 1959 – 1 December 2014) was a Spanish field hockey player who competed in the 1984 Summer Olympics and in the 1988 Summer Olympics.

Oliva is the father of field hockey players Georgina Oliva and Roc Oliva.

References

External links 
 
 
 
 
 

1959 births
2014 deaths
Spanish male field hockey players
Olympic field hockey players of Spain
Field hockey players at the 1984 Summer Olympics
Field hockey players at the 1988 Summer Olympics